Neruppu Da is a 2017 Indian Tamil-language action thriller film written and directed by debutant B. Ashok Kumar.<ref name=":0">{{Cite news|url=http://www.thehindu.com/features/cinema/kabalis-neruppu-da-now-a-film-title/article8824000.ece|title='Kabalis Neruppu Da now a film title|date=2016-07-08|newspaper=The Hindu|language=en-IN|issn=0971-751X|access-date=2016-07-09}}</ref> The film was produced by Vikram Prabhu under his First Artist production company and stars him in the lead role alongside Nikki Galrani alongside an ensemble supporting cast including Sangeetha, Madhusudhan Rao, Vincent Asokan, Varun, and Rajkumar. The music was composed by Sean Roldan with cinematography by R. D. Rajasekhar and editing by debutant Thiyagu. The film's production started in July 2016, and the film was released on 8 September 2017. The film was dubbed in Hindi as Fire Man Surya.

Plot
Guru, Patta, Dhana, Parthi, and Seenu are five childhood friends. Their main aim is to join the fire service and save lives. Until they get their jobs, they go around places putting off fires and saving lives by themselves. Their actions are praised by everyone, including the zonal fire officer Narayanamoorthy, who promises them that they will get their jobs if they write and pass the exam that is needed for them to join the fire service.

The night before the exam, an injured Dhana meets his friends. He tells them that while he was coming back home after seeing his sister, he was stopped by a man named Sadha and his friend Soori. Sadha repeatedly assaults Dhana and tells Soori that he is a don and is unstoppable. When Sadha slaps Dhana, Dhana pushes him away and escapes. The friends later go to the place where the incident happened in order to teach Sadha a lesson. To their shock, they see Sadha dead. It is revealed that when Dhana pushed Sadha, Sadha fell down, hit a rock, and succumbed to his injury. It is also revealed that he was the right hand of "Puliyanthoppu" Ravi, the city's most feared don.

The friends seek help from MLA Kabali, the area counsellor and a well-wisher of Guru. Kabali tells them that Ravi will definitely come to them to avenge Sadha's death and that he cannot help them as Ravi is too powerful for him. Guru suggests that the friends finish off Ravi before he finds them, so the friends decide to kidnap him. The friends later visit Sadha's burial place, where all the dons from Chennai have assembled. Guru tells his friends that once Ravi goes away, they will kidnap him. At the site, Ravi asks Soori, who was drinking when the incident happened, only for him to not remember anything as he was drunk. Ravi then kills Soori in a fit of rage, and Guru is relieved since the only evidence against the friends is the dead Soori. However, Guru then gets a call from two of his friends, who were hiding in another place. They tell him that they have kidnapped Ravi. Guru is very upset and explains to his friends what happened, telling them that they are back in trouble. As they discuss what to do next, Ravi manages to escape, and asks the friends for help. Apparently, Ravi actually does not know who kidnapped him as he met with an accident and became unconscious, so the friends release him. However, Ravi is, in fact, keen on finding the man who kidnapped him and killed Sadha. He then catches Kabali, who tells him everything. The friends are tracked down by Ravi. Guru later engages in a fight with Ravi and his henchmen, where he manages to defeat them but decides to spare Ravi. Guru tells Ravi that Sadha's death was an accident, but Ravi still has vengeance and threatens to kill Guru's loved ones.

Some days later, Guru's father, Manikkam, is killed. Guru suspects that it was Ravi and decides to take revenge. However, he finds him and his henchmen dead. Commissioner Ramkumar reveals to Guru that Ravi was killed before Manikkam. Suddenly, Guru gets a call saying that his friends and girlfriend Vasumathi (Narayanamoorthy's daughter) have been kidnapped, and he must come to a location if he wants to see them alive. There, it is revealed that the person behind the murders is Annam, Sadha's transgender wife who has been trying to avenge his death. She approaches Ravi, but he refuses to help her, saying that Sadha's death was an accident and he will not kill Guru or his friends. Annam is angered by this and kills Ravi, his henchmen, and then Manikkam. Annam tells Guru that Sadha had loved her despite her being a transgender and, thinking that Guru shattered her life, decides to kill Vasumathi. However, Dhana escapes and manages to push Annam into a pyre, which was burning. Guru saves Vasumathi, his friends, and also Annam, stating that he will never let someone get killed by fire. He also apologizes to Annam, saying that Sadha's death was an accident. Annam gets moved by his gesture and forgives him. Guru then leaves the place with his friends and girlfriend.

Later, the five friends write the exam, succeed in passing it, join the fire service, and rush to a spot to save some people.

 Cast 

 Vikram Prabhu as Guru
 Nikki Galrani as Vasumathi
 Sangeetha as Annam
 Madhusudhan Rao as "Puliyanthoppu" Ravi
 Vincent Asokan as Sadha
 Aadukalam Naren as Commissioner Ramkumar
 Ponvannan as Manikkam
 Rajendran as MLA Kabali
 Nagineedu as Narayanamoorthy
 Varun as Dhana
 Rajkumar as Parthi
 Arumugam Kutty Ambani as Kootathil Oruvan
 Arumugam O. P. as Guru's friend
 Vincent as Samba
 Dinesh Karna as Dass
 Raja Simman as Sivam
 R. S. Shivaji as Ravi's friend
 Ramachandran Durairaj as Soori

 Production 
The title of the film was taken from the popular song from Rajinikanth's Kabali'' (2016), with the team feeling that Vikram Prabhu's character as a firefighter and a Rajinikanth fan meant that the title would be apt. The film began production on 11 July 2016 at Old Mahabalipuram Road. Few scenes of the film were shot at SRM University, Kattankulathur, Chennai. This movie deals with the complete life of fire brigades.

Soundtrack
The soundtrack was composed by Sean Roldan.

References

External links 

 

2017 films
Films about firefighting
Films scored by Sean Roldan
Indian action thriller films
Transgender-related films
2010s Tamil-language films
2017 directorial debut films
2017 LGBT-related films
2017 action thriller films
Indian LGBT-related films